The 2018 Rally Finland (formally known as the Neste Rally Finland 2018) was a motor racing event for rally cars that held over four days between 26 and 29 July 2018. It marked the sixty-eighth running of Rally Finland, and was the eighth round of the 2018 FIA World Rally Championship and its support categories, the WRC-2 and WRC-3 championships, and the fourth round of the Junior WRC championship. The event was based in Jyväskylä in Central Finland and consisted of twenty-three special stages totalling  in competitive kilometres.

Esapekka Lappi and Janne Ferm were the defending rally winners. Ott Tänak and Martin Järveoja were the rally winners. Their team, Toyota Gazoo Racing WRT, were the manufacturers' winners. The TGS Worldwide crew of Eerik Pietarinen and Juhana Raitanen won the World Rally Championship-2 category in a Škoda Fabia R5, while Estonian crew Ken Torn and Kuldar Sikk won the World Rally Championship-3.

Background

Championship standings prior to the event
Thierry Neuville and Nicolas Gilsoul entered the round with a twenty-seven-point lead in the World Championship for Drivers and Co-drivers. In the World Championship for Manufacturers, Hyundai Shell Mobis WRT held a twenty-eight-point lead over M-Sport Ford WRT.

Entry list
The following crews were entered into the rally. The event was opened to crews competing in the World Rally Championship, World Rally Championship-2, and the World Rally Championship-3. The final entry list consisted of twelve World Rally Car entries, eighteen in the World Rally Championship-2, and another eighteen entries in the World Rally Championship-3, fifteen of which were eligible to score points in the Junior World Rally Championship.

Notes
 — Driver and co-driver are eligible to score points in the FIA Junior World Rally Championship.

Report

Pre-event
Following Citroën's sacking of Kris Meeke, the team promoted Mads Østberg and Torstein Eriksen to replace him and his co-driver Paul Nagle as lead drivers.

Thursday
Ott Tänak, driving a Yaris, took a 0.7-second lead over championship leader Thierry Neuville, while defending world champion Sébastien Ogier was 0.1 second further behind. Andreas Mikkelsen was in fourth place in another Hyundai i20, another slender 0.1 second behind, while defending rally winner Esapekka Lappi was in fifth. Shakedown top two Mads Østberg and Craig Breen tied in sixth, followed by local Finn Jari-Matti Latvala. Hayden Paddon and Elfyn Evans cleared the stage in ninth and tenth respectively.

Friday
Friday witnessed a great fight between Ott Tänak, who drove a Yaris, and Mads Østberg, who drove a C3. After rally leader changed several times, the Estonian ended the day with a 5.8-second lead. Local Finn Jari-Matti Latvala completed the day in third, with Hayden Paddon led Hyundai in fourth position after Teemu Suninen fell back in the final stage of the day with brake issues in his Fiesta. Title contender Sébastien Ogier, who was second on the road, climbed up to sixth overall after Ford gave his teammate Elfyn Evans a team order, which ordered him to slow down in SS10 before reaching the finish line. Defending rally winner Esapekka Lappi, who stalled his car at the opening stage of the day, cleared the day in eighth place, while Craig Breen, who suffered an early puncture and a late fuel pressure issue, completed the day in ninth. Championship leader Thierry Neuville, who struggled for grip all the day due to being first on the road, completed the leaderboard. Teammate Andreas Mikkelsen finished down the order after rolling his i20.

Saturday

Saturday in Rally Finland was dominated by three Yarises. Ott Tänak, who stormed away with a 39-second over Mads Østberg, Jari-Matti Latvala, who closed the gap the Norwegian to only 5.4 seconds, and Esapekka Lappi, who climbed up four places after his effort, took all eight stage victories of the day to make Toyota a 1-3-4 finish. Hayden Paddon, who led Hyundai in fifth place, manage to stay ahead of local Finn Teemu Suninen despite brake problems and high tyre wear. Defending world champion Sébastien Ogier, who struggled to come to terms with new shock absorbers and an upgraded aerodynamic package, and teammate Elfyn Evans cleared the day in seventh and eighth respectively, while Craig Breen completed the day in ninth overall in another C3. Championship leader Thierry Neuville, who failed to make up yesterday's lost time, completed the leaderboard in tenth place.

Sunday
Ott Tänak took his second rally victory of the season with a Power Stage win in Finland to gain a maximum thirty points after a master-class performance. Mads Østberg edged Jari-Matti Latvala by only 2.8 seconds to finish second overall. Hayden Paddon completed the rally in fourth place after defending rally winner Esapekka Lappi went off in SS20. Sébastien Ogier climbed up to fifth place after Ford gave another team order to Teemu Suninen, who was ordered to check in late at a time control so that he was given a 20-second time penalty and dropped behind his five-time world champion teammate in sixth. Elfyn Evans finished in seventh in another Fiesta, followed by Craig Breen in eighth. Championship leader Thierry Neuville ended his rally ahead of his teammate Andreas Mikkelsen in ninth place. Despite an unsatisfied outcome, he still leads the championship by twenty-one points over the defending world champion.

Classification

Top ten finishers
The following crews finished the rally in each class's top ten.

Other notable finishers
The following notable crews finished the rally outside top ten.

Special stages

Power stage
The Power stage was an 11.12 km stage at the end of the rally. Additional World Championship points were awarded to the five fastest crews.

J-WRC stage winning crews 
Junior World Rally Championship crews scored additional points. Each of the fastest stage time was awarded with one bonus point.

Penalties
The following notable crews were given time penalty during the rally.

Retirements
The following notable crews retired from the event. Under Rally2 regulations, they were eligible to re-enter the event starting from the next leg. Crews that re-entered were given an additional time penalty.

Championship standings after the rally

Drivers' championships

Co-Drivers' championships

Manufacturers' and teams' championships

Notes

References

External links

  
 2018 Rally Finland in e-wrc website
 The official website of the World Rally Championship

Finland
2018
2018 in Finnish sport
July 2018 sports events in Europe